Mateo Frazier (born June 15, 1977) is an American writer, director, producer. He is best known for co-writing and directing the 2013 Lionsgate film Blaze You Out and producing the 2014 Sundance film Drunktown's Finest.

Early life
Frazier was born in Oklahoma, where his parents were attending college. Soon after he returned to Colorado and New Mexico where he spent his childhood. He attended UNLV and received a Bachelor of Arts in Social Sciences 2002 and attended The New School for graduate studies earning a Master of Arts in Media Studies in 2010.

Career
In 2012, he co-wrote/directed the award-winning feature thriller Blaze You Out starring Elizabeth Peña and Raoul Trujillo, released by Lionsgate in July 2013. Also in the summer of 2013, he produced Drunktown's Finest with producing partner Chad Burris, and Executive Producer Robert Redford, which premiered in the NEXT category at Sundance Film Festival in 2014 and has since won a number of awards, including HBO Outfest’s Grand Jury Award for U.S. Dramatic Feature Film and the HBO-sponsored Audience Award for First Feature. In the summer of 2014 he associate produced on the feature film Bare starring Dianna Agron, Paz de la Huerta and Gary Farmer, which premiered at Tribeca Film Festival in April 2015. In February, 2015 he produced his first television segment for the Award Winning European network Arte. Durch die Nacht mit … featuring George R.R. Martin and Sibel Kekilli.

Filmography

Awards and nominations

References

External links
IonCinema.com interview (November 18, 2013)
 
 (September 26, 2011)
Vogue.com (February 19, 2015)

1977 births
Living people
American humanitarians
American film directors
American male screenwriters
American film producers